Ernest Cyril Murray was an Anglican Archdeacon in Ireland.

Murray was educated at King's College, London and ordained in 1933. He served at St Luke, Belfast (Curate); St. Columba's College, Hazaribagh (lecturer); the SPG (secretary, Ireland); Shinrone (incumbent); Upper Ormond (rural dean); and Killaloe Cathedral (canon). He was Archdeacon of Killaloe from 1954 to 1974.

Notes

Alumni of King's College London
Archdeacons of Killaloe
20th-century Irish Anglican priests